Aguie (var.

Administrative structure
Aguié Commune is the seat of the Department of the same name, one of five-second level administrative subdivisions of the Maradi Region. Among the Commune subdivisions within the Department are the "Rural Communes" of Saé Saboua, Arnagou and Giratawa. Nearby villages include Dan Kiri, Dan Gao, Gamji Karama, Dan Rago, Doromawa, Guidan Tonio, and Guidan Kodao.

Population
A primarily Hausa populated region, it is bordered to the south by Katsina State, Nigeria. The 2007 estimated population of Aguié Department was 270,000. The Maradi Region is one of the most densely populated areas of Niger, home to 20 per cent of the country's population, mostly small farmers in rural settlements.

Transport
Aguié lies on the main east-west highway between Maradi and Zinder.

2005–06 Niger food crisis
Aguié Department was particularly hard hit in the 2005-06 Niger food crisis, and the town became a centre for aid efforts.  International rural health and development projects have continued to be based there.

References

Communes of Maradi Region